The Taio mine (Japanese:鯛生金山) was the large gold mine in Oita, Japan. At its peak productivity between 1934 and 1938, it produced 2.3 tons of gold per year, being the most productive gold mine of Japan. Tunnels stretch for 500 meters below ground level, and total tunnels length is 110 km, although all tunnels below 4th are flooded. From 1983, the mine has become a museum, with 800-meter tunnel section opened to the visitors.

Picture gallery

References 

This article incorporates material from Japanese Wikipedia page 鯛生金山, accessed 23 August 2018

External links 
 – Museum home page

Gold mines in Japan
Buildings and structures in Ōita Prefecture